Günther Heidemann (October 21, 1932 – March 15, 2010) was a boxer from Germany. He was born in Berlin.

He competed for Germany in the 1952 Summer Olympics held in Helsinki, Finland in the welterweight event, where he finished in third place.

Two days before the end of World War II, he witnessed how two German snipers killed fifteen Russian soldiers. After each hit, they clapped their hands off, like athletes do. Therefore, he could never travel to Moscow. He had heart problems but died of a stroke.

References
 Günther Heidemann Profile Sports Reference
 Günther Heidemann (Geb. 1932) Der Tagesspiegel (German)

1932 births
2010 deaths
Boxers from Berlin
Olympic boxers of Germany
Olympic bronze medalists for Germany
Boxers at the 1952 Summer Olympics
Olympic medalists in boxing
German male boxers
Medalists at the 1952 Summer Olympics
Welterweight boxers